Johannes Ritter Plum (born 15 February 1995) is a Danish former professional footballer who played as a right winger.

Club career

Nordsjælland
Ritter joined the FC Nordsjælland youth academy as an under-14 player from Helsingør IF. In September 2012, Ritter was selected to Nordsjælland's UEFA Champions League squad.

In the summer of 2014, Ritter was one of six under-19 players promoted to the first-team Danish Superliga squad.

Helsingør
On 2 August 2016, it was announced that Ritter moved to FC Helsingør on an agreement valid for the rest of 2016 after having his full-time contract with FCN Nordsjælland terminated the day before.

He stopped his career in November 2018 due to a hip injury that he had suffered the previous season.

International career
On 13 August 2013, Ritter made his international debut for the Denmark under-19 team. He came on as a substitute in the 83rd minute for Andrew Hjulsager in a 4–0 win in a friendly against Romania.

References

1995 births
Living people
Danish men's footballers
People from Helsingør
Denmark youth international footballers
FC Nordsjælland players
FC Helsingør players
Danish Superliga players
Danish 1st Division players
Association football forwards
Sportspeople from the Capital Region of Denmark